Wendy Cope  (born 21 July 1945) is a contemporary English poet.  She read history at St Hilda's College, Oxford.  She now lives in Ely, Cambridgeshire, with her husband, the poet Lachlan Mackinnon.

Biography
Cope was born in Erith in Kent (now in the London Borough of Bexley), where her father Fred Cope was manager of the local department store, Hedley Mitchell. She was educated at West Lodge Preparatory School in Sidcup and Farrington's School, Chislehurst, both in Kent. Following her graduation from St Hilda's College, Oxford Cope spent fifteen years as a primary-school teacher.  In 1981, she became Arts and Reviews editor for the Inner London Education Authority magazine, Contact. Five years later she became a freelance writer and was a television critic for The Spectator magazine until 1990.

Five collections of her adult poetry have been published, Making Cocoa for Kingsley Amis in 1986, Serious Concerns in 1992, If I Don't Know in 2001,  Family Values in 2011, and Anecdotal Evidence in 2018. She has also edited several anthologies of comic verse and was a judge of the 2007 Man Booker Prize.

In 1998, she was voted the listeners' choice in a BBC Radio 4 poll to succeed Ted Hughes as Poet Laureate. When Andrew Motion's term as Poet Laureate came to an end in 2009, Cope was again widely considered a popular candidate, although she believes the post should be discontinued. Carol Ann Duffy succeeded Motion as Poet Laureate.

Cope was appointed Officer of the Order of the British Empire (OBE) in the 2010 Birthday Honours. In April 2011, the British Library purchased Cope's archive including  manuscripts, school reports and 40,000 emails, the largest email archive they have bought to date. The papers also includes 67 poetry notebooks and unpublished poems. Cope commented "I wanted to find a good home for my archive. The timing was dictated because we had to move home, so we needed some money to buy a house, and the space. So this was the moment. I asked Andrew Motion what I should do, and he told me someone to approach at the British Library. I wasn't sure they would want it, but they did." When the collection is catalogued and organised, the archive will be available to researchers.

In 2013, after 19 years of living together, Cope married Lachlan Mackinnon in a register office, although she has stated that she would have preferred a civil partnership.

In January 2019 she was the guest on BBC Radio 4's long-running programme Desert Island Discs. Her book choice was The Compleet Molesworth, her luxury item was writing materials and her favourite track was Bach's Concerto for Two Violins and Strings in D minor.

Critical reception
Despite her slight output, her books have sold well and she has attracted a popular following with her lighthearted, often comical poetry, as well as achieving literary credibility winning two awards and making an award shortlist over a fourteen-year period. She has a keen eye for the everyday, mundane aspects of English life, especially the desires, frustrations, hopes, confusions and emotions in intimate relationships. Dr Rowan Williams is a well known fan of her work, writing that: "Wendy Cope is without doubt the wittiest of contemporary English poets, and says a lot of extremely serious things". In 2021, the poet and critic Rory Waterman published the first critical book on her work, for the Writers and Their Work series.<ref>[https://liverpooluniversitypress.co.uk/books/id/54574/</ref>

Three haiku from Making Cocoa for Kingsley Amis, where they are presented as being written by the (fictional) Tulse Hill poet Jason Strugnell, were set by the composer Colin Matthews in 1990 as Strugnell's Haiku.

In 2008 Cope's poem "After The Lunch" was used as the lyric  of the song "Waterloo Bridge" by jazz composer and musician Jools Holland and singer Louise Marshall.

Progression of style
Wendy Cope’s style progression spans nearly fifty years with her intermittent poetry collections. While she has released over two dozen publications, her most well-known books are her adult poetry collections. Omitting limited and selected editions, Cope has five adult releases: Making Cocoa for Kingsley Amis (1986), Serious Concerns (1992), If I Don’t Know(2001), Family Values (2011), and her most recent, Anecdotal Evidence (2018). The changes in her both her writing style and life can be tracked in these five collections.

Cope acknowledges herself that her first two releases are quite different from the later ones. Reportedly, her happiness plays a major part in her writing, and her first two collections were written when she was fairly unhappy. In both collections, the poems vary in content, but are similar in structure. Generally, each poem features a lighthearted delightful tone packed with punchy jokes and a dry compressed wit. The punchline is often “centered on men from the point of view of the single heterosexual woman”. Paired with an unencumbered admiration for life and the simple things in it, Making Cocoa for Kingsley Amis and Serious Concerns drove Cope to instant popularity. Cope’s style and humor became so consistent that both fans and critics alike began to label the pieces written in this style as “Wendy Cope poems” - anthems for “several generations of frustrated and conflicted women”. Details like neat rhyme schemes, humorous observations, and unexpected politically-charged strikes at concepts like marriage or the patriarchy, all became admired aspects of Cope’s first two collections, and garnered her both fame and an audience who became hungry for more.

The following three publications are notably different, darker, and less popular, and it’s no secret why. After the wild success of Serious Concerns in the 1990s, Cope’s life changed entirely. With the money and resources to dedicate herself to her writing, she quit teaching and began living with Lachlan Mackinnon, a poet she later married in 2013. As her overall happiness increase, her poetry noticeably changed. Darker, intricate free verse poems overtook the uncomplicated amusing rhymes of the past. Cope began to allude to her battles with depression, a theme present in all of her work, but that grew more evident with each collection. While there had been insertions of the topic in her earlier collections, critics and fans generally ignored them in favor of her more cheery poems”. The past two decades have led to a sense of contentment, along with a confrontation with depression, to take the main stage in If I Don’t Know, Family Values, and Anecdotal Evidence. Freedom and leisure that comes with success has, no doubt, allowed Cope to focus on deeper, more conflicted issues rather than pumping out guaranteed crowd-pleasers.

In terms of popularity, it is clear what fans prefer. Serious Concerns stands as Cope’s most popular book, even thirty years later. In a top-ten list of “must read” Cope poems, every one of the top five are from either Making Cocoa for Kingsley Amis or Serious Concerns. There’s no doubt that these poems are what resonates with readers. However, Cope herself disagrees with the concept of a “Wendy Cope anthem”, and doesn't believe her poetry could be categorized in this way. Cope’s progression and growth, along with her willingness to discuss difficult subjects in her writing, is distinct and unquestionably commendable. Some fans are displeased with the changes and prefer that initial lighthearted approach, but one of the best comic poets from the past fifty years has every authority to develop her style and not to be confined by expectations created by her accomplishments”.

According to multiple sources, Cope’s favorite publication is Anecdotal Evidence and one of her favorite poems is Flowers from Serious Concerns, which is also one of her most famous.

Bibliography

Cope's poetry for adults
 (1986) Making Cocoa for Kingsley Amis (Faber and Faber)
 (1992) Serious Concerns (Faber and Faber)
 (2001) If I Don't Know (Faber and Faber)
 (2011) Family Values (Faber and Faber)
 (2018) Anecdotal Evidence (Faber and Faber)

Collections of Cope's poetry for children
 (1988) Twiddling Your Thumbs (Faber and Faber)
 (1991) The River Girl (Faber and Faber)

Limited editions and selections
 (1980) Across the City [limited edition] (Priapus Press)
 (1984) Hope and the 42 (Other Branch Readings)
 (1986) Poem from a Colour Chart of House Paints [limited edition] (Priapus Press)
 (1988) Does She Like Word Games? (Anvil Press Poetry)
 (1988) Men and Their Boring Arguments (Wykeham)
 (1994) The Squirrel and the Crow'(Prospero Poets)
(1998)Being Boring [limited edition 180 copies] ( Arialia Press) 
 (2008) Two Cures for Love: Selected Poems 1979–2006 (Faber and Faber)
 (2016) A Triumphant Yes  Celandine Press 150 copies signed by the author

Other publications
 (1989) Is That the New Moon? [editor] (HarperCollins)
 (1993) The Orchard Book of Funny Poems [editor] (Orchard)
 (1996) Casting a Spell [contributor] (Faber and Faber)
 (1998) The Funny Side: 101 Humorous Poems [editor] (Faber and Faber)
 (1999) The Faber Book of Bedtime Stories [editor] (Faber and Faber)
 (2000) The Orchard Book of Funny Poems [editor] (Orchard)
 (2001) Heaven on Earth: 101 Happy Poems [editor] (Faber and Faber)
 (2002) Is That The New Moon?: Poems by Women Poets [selector] (Collins)
 (2003) George Herbert: Verse and Prose [selector and introduction] (SPCK)
 (2014) Life, Love and The Archers: recollections, reviews and other prose (Hodder & Stoughton)

References

External links

Profile at Poetry Archive
Profile and poems at Poetry Foundation
BBC profile and video
National Portrait Gallery profile and portrait
Interview with Cope from Dreamcatcher No 15 – 2005

1945 births
Alumni of St Hilda's College, Oxford
English women poets
20th-century English poets
21st-century English poets
Fellows of the Royal Society of Literature
Formalist poets
Living people
Officers of the Order of the British Empire
People from Erith
Writers from Winchester
20th-century English women writers
21st-century English women writers